Salt of this Sea is a 2008 Palestinian film directed by Annemarie Jacir and was an Official Selection of the Cannes International Film Festival in 2008. It is Palestine's submission to the 81st Academy Awards for the Academy Award for Best Foreign Language Film. The film stars Palestinian-American poet Suheir Hammad as Soraya, an American-born Palestinian woman,  who heads to Israel and Palestine on a quest to reclaim her family's home and money that were taken during the 1948 Arab-Israeli War. A young Saleh Bakri also stars in the film in his first role in an Arab film.

See also
List of submissions to the 81st Academy Awards for Best Foreign Language Film
List of Palestinian submissions for the Academy Award for Best Foreign Language Film

References

Awards
 FIPRESCI PRIZE - INTERNATIONAL CRITICS AWARD
International Federation of Film Critics, 2008
 FIRST PRIZE - BEST FILM
Sguardi Altrove Film Festival, Italy 2009
 SPECIAL JURY PRIZE
Osians Asian & Arab Film Festival, 2008
 BEST FIRST FILM
Traverse City Film Festival, 2009
 SPECIAL JURY PRIZE
Oran International Festival of Arab Cinema, 2009
 RANDA CHAHAL PRIZE
Journées cinématographiques de Carthage, 2008
 BEST SCREENPLAY
Dubai International Film Festival, 2008
 BEST OF FEST SELECT
Minneapolis St. Paul International Film Festival 2009
 AUDIENCE CHOICE AWARD
Houston Palestine Film Festival, 2009
 AUDIENCE CHOICE AWARD - BEST FEATURE
Chicago Palestine Film Festival, 2009
 HONORABLE MENTION
Cairo Refugee Film Festival, 2009
 AUDIENCE CHOICE RUNNER UP
Toronto Palestine Film Festival, 2008
 PALESTINE'S OFFICIAL OSCAR ENTRY
FOR BEST FOREIGN-LANGUAGE FILM, 2008
 SOPADIN FINALIST
Grand Prix Best Screenplay, 2007
 CINEMA IN MOTION AWARDS
San Sebastian Film Festival, 2007

External links
 
  Rasha Salti: "Stranger than paradise" The National, Sep. 9, 2008
 Rasha Salti: "Palestinian filmmaker Annemarie Jacir shines at Cannes festival", Nov. 16, 2008
Salt of this Sea Premiere Cannes 2008
Trigon: Salt of this Sea Review
Palestinian filmmakers beat the odds to hit silver screen April 22, 2009, CNN
eFilmCritic.com interview with Suheir Hammad about "Salt of This Sea" by Dan Lybarger

2008 films
2008 drama films
Palestinian drama films
Israeli–Palestinian conflict films
Films set in Palestine (region)